Tarkan Karaalioğlu (born 21 September 1976), better known as MOK, is a German rapper of Turkish descent. His name "MOK" means "Muzik oder Knast" ("Music or jail"). It was awarded to him by Berlin hip hopper Maxim. He is a member of rap crew Die Sekte. He got his own label at Sony BMG called Yo!Musix.

MOK is well known for his controversies with other German rappers, including Bushido, Kool Savas, and Farid Bang. During his career he released many diss tracks, but they did not receive much attention, so the others did not respond.

Discography

Albums
 2004: Neukölln Hustler
 2007: Hustler
 2007: Straßenmukke
 2008: Geldwäsche (with G-Hot)
 2009: Most Wanted
 2013: Ghetto Picasso

Extended plays
 2002: Fick M.O.R.
 2005: Muzik oder Knast

Mixtapes
 2006: Badboys
 2006: Das Beste
 2006: Badboys 2
 2008: Jailhouse Pop

Singles
 2007: Big Boss
 2007: Hustler

References

External links
 http://www.gagfr.com/video/MOK--Gemein-wie-Zehn-Bushido-Diss-221208__v6qn0aE7aCs.html
 Discogs page

1976 births
German people of Turkish descent
German rappers
Living people
Gangsta rappers
People from Neukölln
Singers from Berlin